The 2022 FIBA 3x3 Asia Cup was the fifth edition of the FIBA 3x3 Asia Cup. The games of the final tournament were held in Singapore between 6 July and 10 July 2022.

Participating teams

The FIBA 3x3 Asia Cup returns for its fifth edition this year and will see 53 teams from 30 countries battling it out to win the trophy.  Set to take place from July 6-10 at the event plaza of Marina Bay Sands, the game - with its rising popularity over the years - has reached a significant high in participation numbers. The previous record was set in 2019 with 40 teams from 23 countries.

A total of 30 men’s teams and 23 women’s teams have registered for the number one 3x3 national team competition for teams based in Asia and Oceania. The main draw will start on the third day of competition with the exact same number of teams (12) from each gender.

Main tournaments

Men

Women

Medalists

Men's tournament

Preliminary round

Group A

Group B

Group C

Group D

Knockout round

Women's tournament

Preliminary round

Group A

Group B

Group C

Group D

Knockout round

Final rankings

Men

Women

See also

 FIBA
 FIBA Asia
 2022 FIBA Asia Cup
 2021 FIBA Women's Asia Cup

References

External links
 FIBA 3x3 Asia Cup 2022, www.fiba.basketball

International basketball competitions hosted by Singapore
Asia Cup
FIBA 3x3 Asia Cup
FIBA Asia 3x3 Cup